Krylovka is a rural locality (a selo) in Timiryazevskoye Rural Settlement, Novousmansky District, Voronezh Oblast, Russia. The population was 161 as of 2010. There are 4 streets.

Geography 
Krylovka is located 34 km southeast of Novaya Usman (the district's administrative centre) by road. Mikhaylovka is the nearest rural locality.

References 

Rural localities in Novousmansky District